The 13th Bangladesh National Film Awards, presented by Ministry of Information, Bangladesh to felicitate the best of Bangladeshi Cinema released in the year 1988. The ceremony took place in Dhaka in 1988 and awards were given by then President of Bangladesh. The National Film Awards are the only film awards given by the government itself. Every year, a national panel appointed by the government selects the winning entry, and the award ceremony is held in Dhaka. 1988 was the 13th National Film Awards.

List of winners
This year awards were given in 17 categories. Awards for Best Male Playback Singer was not given in 1988.

Merit Awards

Technical Awards

Special Awards
 Best Child Artist (Special) - Baby Joya (Bheja Chokh)
 Special Award - Firoza Rahman Tina (posthumous)

See also
Bachsas Film Awards
Meril Prothom Alo Awards
Ifad Film Club Award
Babisas Award

References

External links

National Film Awards (Bangladesh) ceremonies
1988  film awards
1990 awards in Bangladesh
1990 in Dhaka
July 1990 events in Bangladesh